Pete Cooper (born 18 November 1951) is a British, London-based fiddler, who performs as a solo artist, and with Cooper and Bolton and Rattle on the Stovepipe.

He was born in Gnosall, Staffordshire, England.  His travels around the world have inspired his playing of many traditional fiddle styles including Irish, American old-time music, Swedish, Eastern European and Scottish as well as the rich English tradition. He also teaches, composes and writes about fiddle music. He plays at Cecil Sharp House in London.

References

External links
His website includes details of publications, CDs, projects and gigs as well as musings and notes on English fiddle players.

1951 births
Living people
British violinists
British male violinists
21st-century violinists
21st-century British male musicians
People from Staffordshire (before 1974)